The H/PJ-38 is a single barrel 130mm naval gun that is used by the People's Liberation Army Navy. Designed in 2005 this naval gun was introduced on the Type 052D destroyer . English and Japanese literature refers to this gun as the H/PJ-38. Lu Yi, a Taiwanese military journalist, gave the official designation of this gun as H/PJ-45.

Design
The H/PJ-38 was designed by the Zhengzhou Mechanical-Electrical Engineering Research Institute (郑州机电工程研究所, also known as the 713th Research Institute of the 7th Academy) through reverse engineering of the Soviet AK-130 twin 130mm naval gun. The H/PJ-38 was manufactured by Inner Mongolia 2nd Machinery Manufacturing Factory (内蒙第二机械制造厂).

Chen Dingfeng (陈汀峰) was the general designer of the H/PJ-38. Dingfeng was also the general designer for the Type 79 100 mm naval gun, Type 210 100 mm naval gun, and the H/PJ26 76mm naval gun. Initially, the Chinese navy was unsatisfied and did not let the AK-130 counterpart go into production, despite all performance parameters being met. The Chinese Navy determined the AK-130 to be out-of-date, which led to the creation of the H/PJ38 program in 2005.

See also

Weapons of comparable role, performance and era 
 4.5 inch Mark 8 naval gun
 5"/54 caliber Mark 45 gun
 French 100 mm naval gun
 Otobreda 127/54 Compact 
Otobreda 127/64
 AK-130

References

130 mm artillery
Artillery of the People's Republic of China
Naval guns of China